Antispila pentalitha is a moth of the family Heliozelidae. It was described by Edward Meyrick in 1916. It is found in Guyana.

References

Moths described in 1916
Heliozelidae